Manwë refers to:

Manwë (Middle-earth), the husband of the Elvish goddess Varda in Tolkien's mythology
385446 Manwë, a planetoid